is a railway station on the Hōhi Main Line in Aso, Kumamoto, Japan, operated by Kyushu Railway Company (JR Kyushu).

Lines

Layout
The station consists of two side platforms serving two tracks at grade. The station building is a wooden structure of traditional Japanese design and houses a staffed ticket window, a waiting area, a shop and a restaurant.

Management of the station has been outsourced to the JR Kyushu Tetsudou Eigyou Co., a wholly owned subsidiary of JR Kyushu specialising in station services. It staffs the ticket window which is equipped with a POS machine but does not have a Midori no Madoguchi facility.

Adjacent stations

History
The line was extended eastward in phases and Miyaji was established as the eastern terminal on 25 January 1918. On the same day, Aso was opened as an intermediate station on the new track with the name . Through-traffic was established between Kumamoto and Ōita. The two lines were merged and the entire stretch redesignated as the Hōhi Main Line. Bōchū was renamed Aso Station on 20 March 1961. With the privatization of JNR on 1 April 1987, the station came under the control of JR Kyushu.

Service between Aso and Bungo-Ogi was restored by 9 July 2016. The sector between Higo-Ōzu and Aso remained closed. JR Kyushu commenced the repair work, starting first with the track from Higo-Ōzu to Tateno.
On 8 August 2020, JR Kyushu reopened the Higo-Ōzu to Aso section of the line, permitting access between Aso and Kumamoto.

On 17 September 2017, Typhoon Talim (Typhoon 18) damaged the Hōhi Main Line at several locations. Services between Aso and Nakahanda were suspended and replaced by bus services. Rail service from Aso to Miemachi was restored by 22 September 2017 Normal rail services between Aso and Ōita were restored by 2 October 2017.

Surrounding area
 Sankō Bus Terminal
 Mount Aso: A 40-minute ride by bus 
 Uchinomaki Onsen
 National Route 57
 National Route 212
 Aso Villa Park Hotel
 Michi no eki Aso

See also
List of railway stations in Japan

References

External links
Aso (JR Kyushu)

Railway stations in Kumamoto Prefecture
Stations of Kyushu Railway Company
Railway stations in Japan opened in 1918